Felicia Montealegre Bernstein (6 February 1922 – 16 June 1978) was a Chilean-American actress, painter, pianist, and social activist born in San Jose, Costa Rica. As an actor, Montealegre was famous for her performances in televised dramas at beginning of the Golden Age of Television, and in theatrical roles on and off Broadway.  

She also appeared with symphony orchestras throughout the United States in dramatic acting and narrating roles, including collaborations with her husband, American composer and conductor Leonard Bernstein.

Life and career

Early life and education 
Montealegre was born on February 6, 1922 in San José, Costa Rica to Clemencia Montealegre Carazo (1898–1963), and Roy Elwood Cohn (1884–1952), a United States mining executive then stationed in Costa Rica. She had two sisters, Nancy Alessandri and Madeline Lecaros. Educated in Chile, she was raised Catholic, and later converted to Judaism, when marrying Leonard Bernstein (her own paternal grandfather had been Jewish). In 1944, Montealegre established herself in New York, where she took piano lessons from her Chilean compatriot Claudio Arrau.

Television career 
Beginning in 1949, Montealegre starred in leading roles on weekly television anthology dramas for Kraft Television Theatre (NBC), Studio One (CBS), The Chevrolet Tele-Theatre (NBC) and The Philco Television Playhouse (NBC), among others. In 1950, she appeared in the leading role of Nora Helmer in dramatization of Henrik Ibsen's A Doll's House on Kraft Television Theatre, alongside John Newland and Theodore Newton. Others appearances include the 1949 CBS teleplay (part of the "Studio One" series) based on Somerset Maugham's novel Of Human Bondage, in which Montealegre played Mildred opposite Charlton Heston as Philip Carey.

Concert performances 
Montealegre's voice can be heard on two works conducted by Bernstein: his own Kaddish Symphony as well as a version of Debussy's Le martyre de Saint Sébastien, partially performed in English.

In popular culture 
Montealegre features prominently in Tom Wolfe's essay "Radical Chic."

Personal life
Montealegre met composer-conductor Leonard Bernstein in 1946 at a party given by Arrau. Their first engagement was broken off, and she subsequently had a several-year relationship with Broadway and Hollywood actor Richard Hart. After Hart's death she married Bernstein, in 1951, with whom she had three children, Jamie, Alexander and Nina.

Montealegre helped found an anti-war organization educating women against the war in Vietnam "Another Mother for Peace" in 1967, and became controversial when she and Bernstein hosted an evening for the Black Panther Party in 1970. She was a primary focus in Tom Wolfe's New York essay recounting the events of that night entitled "Radical Chic: That Party at Lenny's". Two years later, she was also one of the 100 individuals arrested in an antiwar protest in Washington, D.C.

On her mother's side she was a relative of actress Madeleine Stowe, their common ancestor being Mariano Montealegre Bustamante, Vice Head of State of Costa Rica.

Montealegre died of lung cancer in East Hampton, New York, in 1978, aged 56.

References

External links

1922 births
1978 deaths
American stage actresses
American television actresses
American people of Costa Rican-Jewish descent
Chilean people of Costa Rican-Jewish descent
Naturalized citizens of Chile
Converts to Judaism from Roman Catholicism
Costa Rican Jews
Jewish American actresses
People from East Hampton (town), New York
20th-century American actresses
Chilean emigrants to the United States
Chilean Jews
Leonard Bernstein
Deaths from lung cancer in New York (state)
Costa Rican emigrants
Immigrants to Chile